WISS or Wiss may refer to:

As an initialism
 Western International School of Shanghai
 WISS (AM), radio station (1100 AM) licensed to Berlin, Wisconsin, United States
 WISS Trivia Contest, long-running contest run by WISS

As a surname
 Alain Wiss (born 1990), Swiss footballer
 Benno Wiss (born 1962), Swiss cyclist
 Jarkko Wiss (born 1972), Finnish footballer and manager

Other uses
 Wiss, brand of scissors and snips from Apex Tool Group
 Wiss, character from the recurring skit The Land of Gorch
 Wiss Brothers Store, heritage-listed shopping centre in Kalbar, Queensland, Australia
 Wiss House, heritage-listed detached house in Kalbar, Queensland, Australia
 Wiss Platte, mountain in the Rätikon range of the Alps